Palaquium canaliculatum is a species of flowering plant in the family Sapotaceae. It is endemic to Sri Lanka. It is a rare species known from only eight locations in evergreen forest habitat.

References

Endemic flora of Sri Lanka
canaliculatum
Taxonomy articles created by Polbot